Unstrut-Hainich is a former Verwaltungsgemeinschaft in the district of Unstrut-Hainich-Kreis in Thuringia, Germany. The seat of the Verwaltungsgemeinschaft was in Großengottern. It was disbanded in January 2019.

The Verwaltungsgemeinschaft Unstrut-Hainich consisted of the following municipalities:

 Altengottern 
 Flarchheim 
 Großengottern 
 Heroldishausen 
 Mülverstedt 
 Schönstedt 
 Weberstedt

References

Former Verwaltungsgemeinschaften in Thuringia